Sharon Denise Lee (born 13 March 1963) is a retired British judoka.

Judo career
Lee competed in the women's heavyweight event at the 1992 Summer Olympics. In 1986, she won the bronze medal in the +72kg weight category at the judo demonstration sport event as part of the 1986 Commonwealth Games. and four years later represented England, winning two gold medals in the Open category and the +72kg heavyweight category, at the 1990 Commonwealth Games in Auckland, New Zealand.

References

External links
 

1963 births
Living people
British female judoka
Olympic judoka of Great Britain
Judoka at the 1992 Summer Olympics
Sportspeople from Birmingham, West Midlands
Commonwealth Games medallists in judo
Commonwealth Games gold medallists for England
Judoka at the 1990 Commonwealth Games
Medallists at the 1990 Commonwealth Games